National Route 133 is a short national highway of Japan connecting the Port of Yokohama and Sakuragichō, Naka-ku, Yokohama in Japan, with a total length of 1.4 km (0.87 mi).

References

133
Roads in Kanagawa Prefecture
Transport in Yokohama